Frozen: Olaf's Quest is a platform video game developed by 1st Playable Productions and published by GameMill Entertainment. It was first released for Nintendo DS and Nintendo 3DS in North America on November 12, 2013, in Europe on December 6, in Australia on January 18, 2014, and in Japan on December 3, 2015. The game is based on the 2013 animated film Frozen by Disney, and follows snowman Olaf. It is the last DS game to have ever released in Australia.

Reception 
Orla Madden of Nintendo Life gave the game a mixed review and a score of 5/10. While a fan of the film, Madden criticized the lack of presentation, noting a complete lack of dialogue or storyline. Other criticisms included the repetitive gameplay, lack of humor, and a lack of appearances of other characters from the film such as Anna and Elsa. While saying the game would be fun for younger players, she asserted that older gamers would find little to enjoy in the game.

References 

2013 video games
GameMill Entertainment games
Video games based on films
Disney video games
Frozen (franchise) mass media
Nintendo 3DS games
Nintendo DS games
Single-player video games
Video games developed in the United States
Video games set in Northern Europe
1st Playable Productions games
Lightweight (company) games